Odor Pond is located northeast of Stillwater, New York. The outflow creek flows into Salmon Lake. Fish species present in the pond are brown bullhead, and yellow perch. Access via trail on northwest shore. No motors are allowed on Odor Pond.

References

Lakes of New York (state)
Lakes of Herkimer County, New York